Fairfield is a village that is part of the Church of England parish of Brookland and Fairfield on Walland Marsh (part of Romney Marsh) in the Folkestone and Hythe District of Kent, England. Until 1934 it was a civil parish, but was then absorbed into the civil parish of Snargate. The area lies west of the village of Brookland.

Church of St Thomas a Becket
The area is most notable for the isolated church of St Thomas a Becket, a Grade I listed building, in the Romney Deanery.

The church has been used as a filming location, including for:
a 2011 BBC adaption of Great Expectations
a 2012 BBC adaption of Great Expectations
Parade's End, a 2012 BBC serial
a 1972 film adaptation of The Canterbury Tales

References

External links

St Thomas à Becket at Fairfield 
Fairfield, Kent War Memorials Transcription Project

Villages in Kent
Former civil parishes in Kent
Folkestone and Hythe District